Charles Benjamin Monds Fenton (25 November 1839 – 1 September 1908) was an Australian politician. He was the Protectionist member for Wellington in the Tasmanian House of Assembly from 1893 to 1897. He died in 1908 in Burnie.

References

1839 births
1908 deaths
Protectionist Party politicians
Members of the Tasmanian House of Assembly
Place of birth missing
19th-century Australian politicians